Following is a list of Indonesian presidential candidates by number of votes received. Presidential elections through direct voting began in the 2004 Indonesian presidential election, with prior presidents being voted for by the People's Consultative Assembly. Each election has seen an increasing number of total voters due to natural population growth. The parties indicated in the table is the party of the presidential candidate, but generally presidential tickets will be backed by a coalition of multiple political parties.

List

Sources
 

Presidential elections in Indonesia